Lophodoris danielsseni is a species of sea slug, a Dendronotid nudibranch, a marine gastropod mollusc in the family Goniodorididae.

Distribution
This species was first described from Norway. It has subsequently been reported from a few localities between Bergen and Tromsø.

Description
This goniodorid nudibranch is white in colour.

Ecology
Lophodoris danielsseni feeds on bryozoans.

References

Goniodorididae
Gastropods described in 1876